The 2014–15 season was SK Slavia Prague's 22nd season in the Czech First League. The team competed in Czech First League and the Czech Cup.

Squad
Squad at end of season

Out on loan

Competitions

Overall record

Czech First League

League table

Results summary

Results by round

Matches

Czech Cup

References

External links
Official website

SK Slavia Prague seasons
Slavia Prague